Liu Guanxiong (1861, Fuzhou, Fujian – 1927, Tianjin) was a Chinese Admiral from the late Qing dynasty and the early Republic of China who was Navy Minister of China, from 1912 to 1916 and from 1917 to 1919. When he was young he entered the Navy College of Fuzhou  and was sent abroad to Britain. He was named Minister of the Navy and Commander-in-Chief upon the founding of the Republic of China.
He was also Minister of Education (1913) and Transportation Minister (1912). During Yuan Shikai's rule as Emperor in 1915 he was named a Duke. Liu turned to Duan Qirui soon after Yuan's death, but the Chinese fleet became fractured and split due to Duan's refusal to validate the abolished Constitution.

Gallery

External links
 Index Li-Ll at rulers.org

Republic of China politicians from Fujian
Qing dynasty admirals
Chinese admirals
1861 births
1927 deaths
Politicians from Fuzhou
Education Ministers of the Republic of China
Transportation Ministers of the Republic of China
Generals from Fujian
Empire of China (1915–1916)
Republic of China Navy admirals